Laurent Gras may refer to:

Laurent Gras (chef) (born 1965), French chef  
Laurent Gras (ice hockey) (born 1976), French ice hockey player